Francis Jones Spain (February 17, 1909 – June 23, 1977) was an American amateur ice hockey player who competed in the 1936 Winter Olympics in Garmisch-Partenkirchen, Germany.

Frank Spain was born on an ancestral plantation in Brooks County, Georgia, but later moved to Waban, Massachusetts, where he learned to play hockey on frozen ponds.  He attended Phillips Exeter Academy prep school and then Dartmouth College, where he majored in philosophy and played baseball and ice hockey as a member of the class of 1934.  He left Dartmouth to play for the Boston Olympics, where he was the team captain for the 1933–1934 season.  After his amateur ice-hockey career, he served as a naval officer and toured Europe.  Following his marriage in 1941, he settled in Rochester, New York, where he began a business and a family.

In 1936 he was a member and captain of the United States ice hockey team, which won the bronze medal.  The medal currently resides at the United States Hockey Hall of Fame in Eveleth, Minnesota.

He was born in Quitman, Georgia, and died in Fairport, New York.

References
 Dartmouth College Hockey: Northern Ice, by Jack DeGrange and David Shribman.  (Arcadia Publishing, 2005).

External links
 
 
 The Ivy League's Complete History of the Olympic Games

1909 births
1977 deaths
American men's ice hockey centers
Boston Olympics players
Ice hockey people from Georgia (U.S. state)
Ice hockey players at the 1936 Winter Olympics
Medalists at the 1936 Winter Olympics
Olympic bronze medalists for the United States in ice hockey
People from Quitman, Georgia